= Achint Kot =

Village in India

Coordinates: 31°35′N 74°40′E

Achint Kot or AchintKot is a small village in Amritsar-II in Punjab state of India. Its administrative headquarters are located in Amritsar tehsil. The nearest city is the city of Amristar. The village has a total number of population 226 houses residing as per 2011 census report of India. The literacy rate is 67.37%. Children aged 0–6 make up 16.83% of the total population.
